Awenda Provincial Park is a provincial park in Tiny Township, Simcoe County in Central Ontario, Canada, located on a peninsula jutting into Georgian Bay north of Penetanguishene. It is classified as a Natural Environment Park and therefore all land is protected.

On the island, no overnight camping is allowed, and no facilities are provided.

Recreational activities at Awenda include camping, swimming, canoeing and hiking. Geological features include the Nipissing Bluff and a kettle lake formed during the retreat of the glaciers at the end of the most recent ice age. The shoreline consists of a series of sand, cobble, and boulder beaches.

Much of this area was logged around the beginning of the 20th century, so most of the mature deciduous forests here are actually second growth. Although dominated by mature deciduous forest, the park has an incredible diversity of habitats for its size, including: bogs, fens, coastal meadow marshes, dunes and pine oak savanna. It supports a rich variety of plant and animal life -including 32 species of amphibians and reptiles.

Park information
The park contains 6 public campgrounds with approximately 330 sites available and 3 group camping sites allowing for large groups to camp together.  Several sites are equipped with electricity and available for RVs.  Camp sites are available in quiet zones (radio free) and one area of the campground (Snake campground) is pet-free and radio free. Check in times for campsites is 2pm on the date of arrival and campers must be checked out by 2pm on the date of departure. However, with the use of the vehicle permit that is given at time of arrival a camper can use park facilities until 10pm on the day of departure. The park includes 5 beaches, one of which is pet-friendly (pets are required to be on a leash).

These include the:
 Robitaille Homestead Trail ( return), a trail which takes walkers to an ancient dune system. The age of these sand dunes has been estimated at 11,500 years, from the time of the last glacial retreat. The dunes are a very fragile environment and it is prohibited to climb the hillside, stand on the edge of the bluff or climb down the bluff. The purpose is to allow plants to reestablish themselves and to preserve this area for future park visitors.
 Wendat Trail (Loop ), a trail which wraps around Kettle Lake following closely on sections of the shore. An area for wildlife viewing, specifically for birds such as the blue heron, loons, and small birds. A built boardwalk brings visitors over the wetlands.

Canoes can be rented at the park to be used on Kettle's Lake. No bike or kayak rentals available. Natural Heritage programs are scheduled throughout the summer and include Owl Prowls, nature hikes, and children's programs. Park wardens are on staff at all times and are constantly monitoring campgrounds in case of emergency.

References

External links

Friends of Awenda

Provincial parks of Ontario
Parks in Simcoe County
Year of establishment missing
Campsites in Canada
Protected areas of Simcoe County
1975 establishments in Ontario
Protected areas established in 1975